National Primary Route 36, or just Route 36 (or ) is a National Road Route of Costa Rica, located in the Limón province.

Description
In Limón province the route covers Limón canton (Limón, Valle La Estrella, Matama districts), Talamanca canton (Bratsi, Sixaola, Cahuita districts).

History

Binational Sixaola River Bridge 
The Binational Sixaola River Bridge, located at the southeast end of Route 36, is a bridge over the Sixaola river which is the national border between Costa Rica and Panamá.

The bridge is under construction as of October 2019 with a projected delivery date of March 2020, and being supervised by the United Nations Office for Project Services, it will span 260 meters, 16.4 meters wide, one lane in each way, with bicycle lanes and sidewalks. Migration checkpoints on both countries were moved to align with the new bridge, and the old railroad bridge was dismantled for the construction of the new road bridge.

Junction list
The entire route is in Limón province.

References

Highways in Costa Rica